Netherlands competed at the 2010 Winter Paralympics in Vancouver, British Columbia, Canada. The team included 1 athletes, 1 men and 0 women. Competitors from Netherlands did not win any medals.

Medalists
No medals are won during these Paralympic games.

Alpine skiing

See also
Netherlands at the Paralympics
Netherlands at the 2002 Winter Olympics

References

External links
International Paralympic Committee official website
Vancouver 2010 Paralympic Games official website

Nations at the 2010 Winter Paralympics
2010
Summer Paralympics